Chaudhary Group (CG Corp Global) is a multi-national conglomerate headquartered in Nepal. Its businesses include financial services, consumer goods, education, hospitality, energy, consumer electronics, real estate, biotech, and alternative medicine. The group owns 136 companies in 15 different business verticals across five continents.

History
Towards the end of the eighteenth century, Bhuramull Chaudhary, a Marwari businessman from the modern-day Shekhawati district in the Indian state of Rajasthan, was invited to Nepal at the behest of its erstwhile Rana rulers for business. He sold clothes to the royalty and high-end customers in Kathmandu going from door-to-door and later started his own store in Kathmandu.

Binod's father, Lunkaran Das Chaudhary, laid the foundations of the group. He imported consumer electronics and garments from Japan, South Korea, Europe, and India. Lunkaran started Nepal's first department store, Arun Emporium, in 1968. He exported jute to the US and Europe in the early-1960s when Nepal's trade with the outside world was limited to India.

Wai Wai Noodles

Wai Wai is an international brand of instant noodles produced initially in Thailand by Thai Preserved Food Factory Co. since 1972. Chaudhary Group with technical assistance of  the company introduced Wai Wai in Nepal in 1985. The Chaudhary Group built four factories in Nepal and six factories in India for the manufacture and distribution of Wai Wai and other branded instant noodles. CG is expanding with new plants in Nepal, India, Bangladesh, Serbia, Kazakhstan and Saudi Arabia. Along with other noodle brands of India, one segment of Xpress Noodles, a product of CG  was banned in the Tamil Nadu state of India in 2015 for a period of three months citing high levels of lead in similar noodle brand known as Maggi. The Assam government had also banned Mimi, another product from CG for one month under the Food Safety and Standard Act 2006. Subsequently, concerned authorities declared the noodles safe as they proved to contain no lead and harmful materials. Wai Wai claims 20 percent Indian market share.

Other corporate activities

Financial services 
Chaudhary Group has a controlling stake in Nabil Bank, Nepal's largest private-sector commercial bank. The group operates CG Finco (financial company), United Remit (remittance company), United Finance (financial company), and United Insurance Company.

Hotels 
The hospitality arm of Chaudhary Group, CG Hotels and Resorts, operates hotels.

Education 
Chaudhary Group runs Chandbagh schools, Campion schools and colleges, and Delhi Public School in Nepal. Outside Nepal, it has stakes in AEC Education and Malvern House in UK.

Electronics 

The group assembles and distributes consumer electronics (smartphones, refrigerators, washing machines, microwave ovens, TVs, vacuum cleaners, and various other products) across Nepal. It imports and distributes other brands such as TCL, Intex, Godrej, and Kelvinator. The best-known brand that the group deals in is LG Corporation of South Korea.

Telecoms 
CG Group has signed a deal worth $1 million with China's Huawei to launch 4G services in Nepal.

Philanthropy 
The Chaudhary Foundation assisted in building 10,000 transitional shelters for survivors of the April 2015 Nepal earthquake. It also committed to build 100 schools for those damaged in the earthquake. The foundation has handed over 2500 shelters and 40 school buildings. Due to government norms, the foundation is now moving away from transitional shelter to permanent housing and working on building a "model village".

References

Conglomerate companies of Nepal
Conglomerate companies established in 1970
1970 establishments in Nepal